Agios Georgios is a village located in the Nicosia District of Cyprus, near the town of Agia Marina.

Communities in Nicosia District